Chained Up is the second studio album by the South Korean boy band VIXX. It was released on  November 10, 2015 under the label of Jellyfish Entertainment. It features the single "Chained Up".

Background and promotions
In late October Jellyfish Entertainment announced that VIXX would be having a comeback on November 10, with their second full studio album. On November 1, Jellyfish Entertainment released on VIXX’s official Facebook and Twitter individual image teasers and a group image teaser on their official website along with the upcoming title, Chained Up. On November 2, Jellyfish Entertainment started a Hidden Key Game on Facebook and Twitter in which in order to find hidden image teasers relating to Chained Up on VIXX's official website.

On November 10, VIXX’s second studio album Chained Up was released along with the music video for “Chained Up”. On the same day VIXX held a showcase for Chained Up at AX Korea in Seoul’s Gwangjin-gu. Upon the release of Chained Up, the title song was ranked number one on Mnet, Genie, Monkey3 and Naver Music, whilst the remaining songs also ranked taking over the charts. VIXX started their promotions for “Chained Up” on Music Bank on November 13. On November 17, VIXX gained their first win for "Chained Up" on The Show. On the 19th of November Chained Up  debuted at number three on the Billboard World Albums Chart. On December 4, 2015 VIXX wrapped up their promotional cycle for Chained Up on Music Bank with a goodbye stage performance.

Showcase Tour

Track listing
The credits are adapted from the official homepage of the group.

Chart performance

Awards and nominations

Awards

Music program awards

Release history

See also
 List of K-pop albums on the Billboard charts
 List of Gaon Album Chart number ones of 2015

References

External links
 
 

2015 albums
VIXX albums
Jellyfish Entertainment albums
Stone Music Entertainment albums
Korean-language albums